The Manitoba Rangers was an infantry regiment of the Non-Permanent Active Militia of the Canadian Militia (now the Canadian Army). In 1936, the regiment was converted to artillery and now exists as the 26th Field Artillery Regiment, RCA.

Lineage

The Manitoba Rangers 

 Originated on 1 April 1908, in Brandon, Manitoba, as the 99th Regiment.
 Redesignated on 1 May 1911, as the 99th Manitoba Rangers.
 Redesignated on 12 March 1920, as The Manitoba Rangers.
 Converted to Artillery on 15 December 1936, and Amalgamated with the 59th Field Battery, RCA, and Redesignated as the 26th Field Brigade, RCA (now the 26th Field Artillery Regiment, RCA).

Perpetuations 

 45th Battalion (Manitoba), CEF
 79th Battalion (Manitoba), CEF
 181st Battalion (Brandon), CEF

History

Early History 
On 1 April 1908, the 99th Regiment Manitoba Rangers was first authorized for service. The Regiment's Headquarters was in Brandon and had companies in at Brandon, Portage la Prairie and Carberry, Manitoba.

The Great War 
On 6 August 1914, Details from the 99th Manitoba Rangers were placed on active service for local protection duties.

On 7 November 1914, the 45th Battalion (Manitoba), CEF was authorized for service and on 1 April 1916, the battalion embarked for Great Britain. After its arrival in the UK, the battalion provided reinforcements to the Canadian Corps in the field. On 7 July 1916, the battalion was absorbed by the 11th Reserve Battalion, CEF. On 17 July 1917, the 45th Battalion, CEF was disbanded.

On 10 July 1915, the 79th Battalion (Manitoba), CEF was authorized for service and on 24 April 1916, the battalion embarked for Great Britain. After its arrival in the UK, the battalion provided reinforcements to the Canadian Corps in the field. On 12 July 1916, the battalion was absorbed by the 17th Reserve Battalion, CEF. On 12 October 1917, the 79th Battalion, CEF was disbanded.

On 15 July 1916, the 181st Battalion (Brandon), CEF was authorized for service and on 18 April 1917, the battalion embarked for Great Britain. After its arrival in the UK, on 30 April 1917, the battalion's personnel were absorbed by the 18th Reserve Battalion, CEF to provide reinforcements for the Canadian Corps in the field. On 17 July 1917, the 181st Battalion, CEF was disbanded.

1920s-1930s 
On 15 March 1920, as a result of the Otter Commission and the following reorganization of the Canadian Militia, the 99th Manitoba Rangers was Redesignated as The Manitoba Rangers and was reorganized with 3 battalions (2 of them paper-only reserve battalions) to perpetuate the assigned war-raised battalions of the Canadian Expeditionary Force.

Organization

98th Regiment (1 April 1908) 

 Regimental Headquarters (Brandon, Manitoba)
 A Company (Brandon, Manitoba)
 B Company (Brandon, Manitoba)
 C Company (Portage la Prairie, Manitoba; redesignated on 1 April 1910, as D Company)
 D Company (Portage La Prairie, Manitoba; redesignated on 1 April 1910, as E Company)
 E Company (Carberry, Manitoba; moved on 1 April 1910, to Brandon, MB and redesignated as C Company)
 F Company (Souris, Manitoba; moved on 16 June 1913, to Brandon, MB)

The Manitoba Rangers (15 March 1920) 

 1st Battalion (perpetuating the 45th Battalion, CEF)
 2nd (Reserve) Battalion (perpetuating the 79th Battalion, CEF)
 3rd (Reserve) Battalion (perpetuating the 181st Battalion, CEF)

Alliances 

  - The Sherwood Foresters (Nottinghamshire and Derbyshire Regiment) (Until 1936)

Battle Honours 

 Mount Sorrel
 Somme, 1916
 Arras, 1917, ‘18
 Hill 70
 Ypres, 1917
 Amiens
 Hindenburg Line
 Pursuit to Mons

References 



Ranger regiments of Canada
Military units and formations of Manitoba
Military units and formations established in 1908
Military units and formations disestablished in 1936